Kaj Bid (also Romanized as Kaj Bīd; also known as Kaj Bīd-e Pā’īn and Kaj Bīd Pā’īn) is a village in Golestan Rural District, in the Central District of Jajrom County, North Khorasan Province, Iran. At the 2006 census, its population was 9, in 4 families.

References 

Populated places in Jajrom County